Matti Risto Tapio "Hakki" Hagman (21 September 1955 – 11 October 2016) was a Finnish professional ice hockey player. Hagman was the first Finnish-born and Finnish-trained player to play in the National Hockey League (NHL) and the first to play in a Stanley Cup final. The first Finnish-born player in NHL was Albert Pudas, who never played hockey in Finland, having moved to Canada at the age of one. Hagman's jersey number 20 is also one of the eight retired numbers in HIFK, where he was a prominent player.

NHL & WHA career

Boston Bruins (1976–1977)
Hagman played 237 NHL games over seven seasons. He debuted for the Boston Bruins on 7 October 1976 as they hosted the Minnesota North Stars. During his time in Boston, Hagman was coached by famous Canadian Head Coach Don Cherry. During his time with the Bruins, Hagman did not get much time on ice but he did score well. During his first NHL season, Matti Hagman scored 28 points in 75 games though being played on the third and fourth lines who do not have much offensive time on ice.

Quebec Nordiques (1977–1978)
Hagman joined the WHA Quebec Nordiques in 1977 after they purchased him from Boston. Despite scoring 3 assists in his first Nordiques game, Hagman returned to Finland in 1978 unhappy with playing abroad. He joined Helsinki IFK and went on to lead the Finnish league in points in 1979–80, 1982–83, 1983–84 and 1984–85. Hagman played 3 Canada Cups, as Finland finished sixth in each tournament (1976, 1981, and 1987). He also played on the fourth-place Finnish team in the 1976 Winter Olympics.

Edmonton Oilers (1980–1982)
Hagman was more prominent a player on the Edmonton Oilers as they made the transition from WHA to NHL play. Though being originally a Center, Hagman played left wing on the line with all stars Mark Messier and Glenn Anderson during the 1980–81 campaign. Hagman moved from center to left wing because the Oilers had two top centers; Mark Messier and Wayne Gretzky. An injury in training camp the next year limited Hagman to just a few games and spelt the end to his NHL career.

After retirement

Hagman was named Martigny (Switzerland) head coach in 2004. Hagman also has coached numerous Finnish Ice Hockey teams.

Personal life
Hagman was the father of Niklas Hagman who also played in the NHL. He was also the brother-in-law of former indoor soccer star Kai Haaskivi.

Hagman's sister Riitta Salin won a gold medal in 400 metres at the 1974 European Athletics Championships.

Hagman died after a long illness in Espoo, Finland, on 11 October 2016. He died in hospital after seeking treatment a few days earlier.

Career statistics

Regular season and playoffs

International

References

External links
 hockeydraftcentral profile of 1975 NHL Draft pick Hagman, No. 104 overall
 

1955 births
2016 deaths
Boston Bruins draft picks
Boston Bruins players
Edmonton Oilers players
Finnish expatriate ice hockey players in the United States
Finnish expatriate ice hockey players in Canada
Finnish ice hockey centres
HIFK (ice hockey) players
Ice hockey players at the 1976 Winter Olympics
Ice hockey players with retired numbers
New England Whalers draft picks
Olympic ice hockey players of Finland
Quebec Nordiques (WHA) players
Ice hockey people from Helsinki